John Kessack Ogston (15 January 1939 – 16 August 2017) was a Scottish professional footballer, who played as a goalkeeper for Aberdeen, Liverpool and Doncaster Rovers.

Ogston was born in Aberdeen and played youth football with Banks O' Dee where he won the Scottish Junior Cup in 1957. A year later in 1958, he started his professional career with Aberdeen. He was fondly known as "Tubby" in his time there.

He joined English club Liverpool for a fee of £10,000 in September 1965, but his only first team appearance was in a 3-1 League victory over Newcastle United on 7 April 1967.

He moved to Doncaster Rovers in 1968 on loan, and then signed permanently the following season. Whilst at Doncaster, he was a member of the Fourth Division title winning side of 1968–69, and made a total of 77 appearances in League and cup.

In 1971, he returned north of the border to play for Buckie Thistle for a season, before playing with several teams in the Highland League, including Huntly, Rothes, Fraserburgh, and Deveronvale. He finally retired on 16 September 1974.

References

1939 births
2017 deaths
Footballers from Aberdeen
Scottish footballers
Association football goalkeepers
Banks O' Dee F.C. players
Aberdeen F.C. players
Liverpool F.C. players
Doncaster Rovers F.C. players
Buckie Thistle F.C. players
Huntly F.C. players
Rothes F.C. players
Fraserburgh F.C. players
Deveronvale F.C. players
Scottish Football League players
English Football League players
Scottish Football League representative players
Scotland under-23 international footballers
Place of death missing